Paul Oziol de Pignol (born 14 July 1892, date of death unknown) was a French fencer. He competed in the team sabre event at the 1928 Summer Olympics.

References

External links
 

1892 births
Year of death missing
French male sabre fencers
Olympic fencers of France
Fencers at the 1928 Summer Olympics